Anna Ustinova (born 8 December 1985) is a Kazakhstani high jumper.

She finished seventh at the 2004 World Junior Championships and the 2005 Universiade, won the bronze medal at the 2005 Asian Championships and finished sixth at the 2006 Asian Games. In 2007, she won bronze medals at the Asian Championships and the Universiade, before competing at the 2007 World Championships without reaching the final. She won the silver medal at the 2010 Asian Indoor Athletics Championships behind compatriot Marina Aitova.

Her personal best jump is 1.92 metres, achieved in July 2006 in Almaty.

Competition record

References 
 

1985 births
Living people
Kazakhstani female high jumpers
Asian Games medalists in athletics (track and field)
Athletes (track and field) at the 2006 Asian Games
Athletes (track and field) at the 2010 Asian Games
Universiade medalists in athletics (track and field)
Asian Games bronze medalists for Kazakhstan
Medalists at the 2010 Asian Games
Universiade bronze medalists for Kazakhstan
Competitors at the 2005 Summer Universiade
Medalists at the 2007 Summer Universiade